Thakur Ram Lal (7 July 1929 – 6 July 2002) was an Indian politician and a leader of the Indian National Congress in Himachal Pradesh. 

He was elected to the Himachal Pradesh Vidhan Sabha from Jubbal Kotkhai constituency in 1957. Later, he was re-elected to the Himachal Pradesh Vidhan Sabha from the same constituency in 1962, 1967, 1977, 1980, and 1982.

He became the second Chief Minister of Himachal Pradesh on 28 January 1977 and remained in office till 30 April 1977. He was the leader of opposition in the Himachal Pradesh Vidhan Sabha from 29 June 1977 to 13 February 1980. He again became the Chief Minister of the state on 14 February 1980 and remained in office till 7 April 1983.

Later, he served as Governor of Andhra Pradesh from 15 August 1983 to 29 August 1984. His name got etched in infamy, as he appointed the Finance minister of Andhrapradesh Mr. N Baskar Rao as Chief Minister, when the incumbent CM sri. N.T.Rama Rao  was getting surgery in the USA. This change was supposedly done at the behest of then Congress Leadership, even when Baskar Rao had no more than 20% of MLAs supporting him. NTR returned to Andhra's capital one week later, but was adamantly denied justice by Ram Lal. Then NTR launched massive campaigning against Ram Lal and Congress. 30 days later, President Zail Singh dismissed Ram Lal, and 3 days later NT Rama Rao again became Chief Minister of Andhra.

He was also Minister of Science and technology.

He died in Shimla following a massive cardiac arrest on 6 July 2002. His grandson, Rohit Thakur is an MLA from Jubbal-Kotkhai.

In addition, he is also Chief Whip in the state government.

Political career

Ram Lal had the distinction of having been elected to Vidhan Sabha from Jubbal Kotkhai constituency nine times since 1957 by big margins. Even during the period of worst ever anti-congress wave in year 1977, he was elected to state assembly, securing 60.2 percent of total votes polled. In year 1983 he resigned as Chief Minister and was succeeded by Virbhadra Singh, former Union Minister of State. He served as Chief Minister for 1048 days.

Background

Thakur Ram Lal was survived by four daughters, a grandson and a granddaughter. Ram Lal was considered a symbol of hopes and aspirations for the people of his constituency and the state which he served with devotion.

References

Governors of Andhra Pradesh
Chief Ministers of Himachal Pradesh
People from Shimla
Himachal Pradesh MLAs 1967–1972
Himachal Pradesh MLAs 1972–1977
Himachal Pradesh MLAs 1977–1982
Himachal Pradesh MLAs 1982–1985
Himachal Pradesh MLAs 1990–1992
Himachal Pradesh MLAs 1993–1998
Himachal Pradesh MLAs 1998–2003
1929 births
2002 deaths
Chief ministers from Indian National Congress
Indian National Congress politicians
Janata Dal politicians